The 1893 Colorado Agricultural football team represented Colorado Agricultural College (now known as Colorado State University) in the Colorado Football Association (CFA) during the 1893 college football season. The 1893 season was the school's first fall football season after the team's inaugural season in the spring of 1893.

The team, then known as the CACs, compiled a 1–3 record and was outscored by a total of 214 to 126.  The team had no coach.

Schedule

References

Colorado Agricultural
Colorado State Rams football seasons
Colorado Agricultural football